The 1921–22 Divizia A was the tenth season of Divizia A, the top-level football league of Romania.

Participating teams

Final Tournament of Regions

Quarters

1 The team from Sibiu failed to appear, so it lost the game with 0–3, by administrative decision.

Semifinals

2 The team from Bucharest failed to appear, so it lost the game with 0–3, by administrative decision.

Final
17 September 1922, Timișoara

References

Liga I seasons
1921–22 in European association football leagues
1921–22 in Romanian football